In the theory of dynamical systems, the exponential map can be used as the evolution function of the discrete nonlinear dynamical system.

Family
The family of exponential functions is called the exponential family.

Forms
There are many forms of these maps, many of which are equivalent under a coordinate transformation. For example two of the most common ones are:

The second one can be mapped to the first using the fact that , so  is the same under the transformation . The only difference is that, due to multi-valued properties of exponentiation, there may be a few select cases that can only be found in one version. Similar arguments can be made for many other formulas.

References

Chaotic maps